The Glorification of the Virgin is a 15th-century painting attributed to Geertgen tot Sint Jans. It was painted c, 1490–1495 and was originally part of a diptych. It shows the Virgin Mary holding Jesus and surrounded by three rings of angels. 

Mary wears a crown lined by five white and one red roses. She is surrounded by a two golden radiant and glowing circle. The inner ring contains six angles holding the Arma Christi (instruments of the Passion of Jesus): the cross, spear, crown of thorns, tammer and nails, the whip and the a sponge soaked in vinegar. In the outer ring, musical angels play various instruments and wave bells.

The panel is held in the collection of Museum Boijmans Van Beuningen, Rotterdam, Netherlands.

References

External links
 

1490s paintings
Angels in art
Paintings in the collection of the Museum Boijmans Van Beuningen
Paintings by Geertgen tot Sint Jans
Paintings of the Madonna and Child